Evgeny Zanan (born 5 February 1998) is a Russia born Israeli chess player who holds the title of Grandmaster (GM) (2020).

Biography
In 2009, Evgeny Zanan won silver medal in Russian Youth Chess Championship in U12 age group. He played for Russia in European Youth Chess Championships and World Youth Chess Championships in the different age groups and best result reached in 2009 in Fermo, when he won European Youth Chess Championship in the U12 age group. About this success he became FIDE Master (FM) title.

Moved to Israel in 2010. Evgeny Zanan played in Israel Team Chess Championships for Beersheba chess club, as well as participated in individual chess tournaments.

Evgeny Zanan played for Israel team:
 In 2014 in World Youth U16 Chess Olympiad;
 In 2016 in European Boys' U18 Team Chess Championship.

In 2017, he was awarded the FIDE International Master (IM) title followed by the title of Grandmaster (GM) in 2020.

References

External links
 
 Evgeny Zanan chess games at 365chess.com

1998 births
Living people
Russian chess players
Israeli chess players
Chess grandmasters
Sportspeople from Beersheba
Russian emigrants to Israel